Stefanie Petermichl (born 1971) is a German mathematical analyst who works as a professor at the University of Toulouse, in France. Topics of her research include harmonic analysis, several complex variables, stochastic control, and elliptic partial differential equations.

Education and career
Petermichl studied at the Karlsruhe Institute of Technology, and then did her graduate studies at Michigan State University, completing her Ph.D. in 2000 under the supervision of Alexander Volberg. After postdoctoral studies at the Institute for Advanced Study and Brown University, she joined the faculty of the University of Texas at Austin in 2005. She moved to the University of Bordeaux in 2007, and again to Toulouse in 2009. Since 2019 she holds the Humboldt chair at the University of Würzburg.

Recognition
Petermichl won the Salem Prize for 2006 "for her work on several crucial impacts to the theory of vector valued singular operators". She was the first woman to win that prize. In 2012 the French Academy of Sciences gave her their Ernest Déchelle Prize. She became a member of the Institut Universitaire de France in 2013.
She is an invited speaker at the 2018 International Congress of Mathematicians, speaking in the section on Analysis and Operator Algebras.
In 2016 she was awarded a European Research Council (ERC) grant.

References

1971 births
Living people
21st-century German mathematicians
French mathematicians
Women mathematicians
Karlsruhe Institute of Technology alumni
Michigan State University alumni
University of Texas at Austin faculty
Academic staff of the University of Bordeaux
Academic staff of the University of Toulouse
European Research Council grantees